Australian Indigenous Sovereignty refers to various rights claimed by Aboriginal and Torres Strait Islander peoples over parts or all of Australia. Such rights are said to derive from Indigenous peoples' occupation and ownership of Australia prior to colonisation and through their continuing spiritual connection to land. Indigenous sovereignty is currently not explicitly recognised in the Australian Constitution or under Australian law.

Political movements have emerged in the 20th and 21st centuries around the cause of Indigenous Sovereignty, seeking various political, economic and cultural rights both within and outside of the Australian State. Some have called for constitutional amendments both to recognise First Nations sovereignty of the land and to provide an Indigenous voice to parliament. According to some supporters, the recognition of the prior occupation and ownership of Australia means accepting sovereignty by the First Peoples, and also paves the way for a treaty between the First Peoples and the Government of Australia.

Background

Aboriginal peoples have occupied mainland Australia since at least 65,000 years ago, whereas colonisation of Australia by the British only began in 1788 with the arrival of Governor Arthur Phillip and the First Fleet. No treaty was signed with the Aboriginal peoples of Port Jackson at the time, and sovereignty of the land has never been ceded by any First Nations people since. Notably, the Letters Patent establishing the Province of South Australia of 1836 (unlike the South Australia Act 1834, which it amended), included recognition of the rights of the Aboriginal peoples of South Australia.

After the colonisation of Australia, the British afforded very little recognition of Aboriginal customs and laws in the various Australian colonies.  In 1840, all Governors in Australia and New Zealand were directed that all Aboriginal customary law was to be superseded by British law.

From the 1920s until the 1967 referendum, the struggle for the rights of Indigenous Australians was expressed in terms of demands for full citizenship rights. The Nationality and Citizenship Act 1948 (Cth) granted nominal citizenship to Indigenous Australians, however the vast array of discriminatory laws and practices meant that they were citizens in name only. Only following the civil rights movement in Australia with protections such as the Racial Discrimination Act 1975 (Cth) did explicit discriminatory laws end.

However, the use of the citizenship framework to agitate for rights was not uncontroversial as this framework implicitly recognised and affirmed the authority of the Australian state. There remained great suspicion that civil rights were granted as a part of a broader cultural assimilation by the State.

Following the 1967 referendum, greater emphasis was placed on Indigenous Sovereignty to call for greater self-autonomy and self-determination. New activists emerged, challenging the assumptions of the previous generation by conceptualising their struggle as that of an oppressed people rather than as minority group seeking inclusion.

Current Recognition
Indigenous sovereignty has not been recognised under Australian law, whether as sovereignty that existed before colonisation or that still exists. This is not the case for other countries colonised by British settlers. The US recognises the continuing tribal sovereignty of native American nations and allows a certain level of self-governance and law making. Canada recognises a certain level of sovereignty with it's Indigenous Peoples, with courts upholding treaties agreed to at colonisation (such as in the case of R. v. Sioui 1990) and other treaty negotiations ongoing at different levels of government.

In Coe v Commonwealth (1979) the High Court rejected the notion that there existed an Aboriginal Nation that exercised sovereignty of an even limited kind, distinguishing the US case of Cherokee Nation v. Georgia (1831) which recognised Native American nations as 'domestic dependent nations' of the US by reasoning that the Aboriginal People of Australia are not organised as a "distinct political society separated from others" and that they have never been uniformly treated as a state.

In Mabo v Queensland (No 2) (1992), the high court recognised the pre-colonial land interests of Indigenous Australians within the common law of Australia in the form of native title. However, these rights did not arise due to continuing Indigenous sovereignty, the court merely held that existing rights to land held by Indigenous groups were not automatically extinguished on acquisition of sovereignty by the Crown. Additionally, the case has been interpreted by the High Court in later cases as also holding that there no longer exists any limited sovereignty in Indigenous groups. Furthermore, the court held that the validity of the acquisition of sovereignty by the Crown cannot be challenged in the courts. However by also rejecting previous authorities that characterised Indigenous societies as "without laws, without a sovereign and primitive in their social organization" the judgment has also been taken to implicitly recognise the existence of Indigenous sovereignty prior to colonisation.

Conception
The rights and political movements associated with Indigenous Sovereignty vary significantly and there is no consensus as to what recognising Indigenous Sovereignty would entail. Some earlier activists raised the possibility of full secession from Australia, however most sought a different level of autonomy within the State. Other call for reparations, self-governence and the ability to live under traditional law unimpeded, with any future interactions between Australia and Indigenous Nations to be at a minimum. The recognition of an Indigenous Nation under the Commonwealth has been compared with the shared responsibility and sovereignty between the states and territories and the federal government. Recognition of Indigenous Sovereignty is also a key part of the Uluru Statement from the Heart.

Uluru Statement from the Heart
In 2017, the Uluru Statement from the Heart was released which stated that Aboriginal and Torres Strait Islander tribes were the original sovereign nations of the land of Australia. Furthermore, this sovereignty is of a spiritual nature and has never been ceded or extinguished, instead co-existing with the sovereignty of the Crown.

Following this, the document calls for constitutional changes and reform such that "this ancient sovereignty can shine through as a fuller expression of Australia’s nationhood". The reforms sought are a constitutional amendment to provide for an Indigenous Voice to Parliament, a makarrata Commission to engage in agreement making between governments and first Nlnations and a truth telling process.

A referendum to establish the voice to parliament, as required for any constitutional amendments, was announced by the Albanese Government and is planned for the later half of 2023.

As part of the debate over the voice to parliament Lidia Thorpe, an independent Senator elected as a Green, expressed concerns that the voice model will impact Indigenous sovereignty. However, these concerns have been found to be baseless by government ministers, constitutional and international law scholars, and voice advocates such as Megan Davis and Noel Pearson.

20th century activism
In 1972, the Aboriginal Tent Embassy was established on the steps of Old Parliament House in Canberra, the Australian capital, to demand sovereignty for the Aboriginal Australian peoples.  Demands of the Tent Embassy have included land rights and mineral rights to Aboriginal lands, legal and political control of the Northern Territory, and compensation for land stolen.

In 1979 author and activist Kevin Gilbert led the "National Aboriginal Government" protest on Capital Hill, Canberra, calling for acceptance of Aboriginal Sovereignty.

In 1988, the Australian Bicentenary, the "Aboriginal Sovereign Treaty '88 Campaign" called for recognition of Aboriginal sovereignty and for a treaty to be enacted between the Commonwealth of Australia and Aboriginal nations. Gilbert became chair of the Treaty '88 campaign. He defined the legal argument for a treaty or treaties and Aboriginal sovereignty in his 1987 work Aboriginal Sovereignty, Justice, the Law and  Land.

21st century debate
The Aboriginal Tent Embassy, still in place on its 50th anniversary , remains a symbol of Aboriginal protest relating to various Indigenous issues. Protests have been held there against Aboriginal deaths in custody, the Howard government’s 2007 Northern Territory Intervention, and cuts to services. In 2020, its most prominent issues are Aboriginal sovereignty and an acknowledgement of Indigenous right to self-determination. In 2012, there were seven tent embassies dotted around the nation.

In February 2012, barrister and 2009 Australian of the Year Mick Dodson addressed Parliament on the subject of "Constitutional Recognition of Indigenous Australians". He raised three issues: an acknowledgement in the Constitution that the Aboriginal and Torres Strait Islander peoples were in Australia first and also in possession of the country, when the British Crown asserted its sovereignty over the whole continent, and it follows that the land was taken without consent; the second was about issues of Aboriginal identity being respected and protected within the Constitution and Australian law; and the third element related to equal citizenship under law.

Related issues

Treaties and constitutional recognition

A treaty is a legal document defining the relationship between two sovereign entities.  there are no treaties between the Australian Government and Indigenous peoples of Australia; There are ongoing negotiations in some states and territories of Australia on the possible crafting of treaties between Indigenous peoples and governments.

A treaty between the Australian government and the country's First Peoples would at a minimum recognise symbolically Indigenous Sovereignty through recognising them as independent actors not totally represented currently by the State of Australia.

There have also been moves towards constitutional changes both to recognise prior occupation and ownership (and thus sovereignty), and an Indigenous voice to parliament enshrined in the Constitution.

Symbolic recognition of land ownership
Many public events in Australia, including ceremonies, speeches, conferences and festivals, begin with a Welcome to Country or Acknowledgement of Country, intended to highlight the cultural significance of the surrounding area to a particular Aboriginal clan or language group. They are often made by elders of the nation on whose traditional lands each event is taking place. Since 2008, a Welcome to Country has been incorporated into the ceremonial opening of the Parliament of Australia, an event which occurs after each federal election.

See also

Aboriginal land rights in Australia

Barunga Statement
Camp Sovereignty
Native title in Australia
Sovereign Yidindji Government (2014-since)

Murrawarri Republic  (2013-since)
Uluru Statement from the Heart

References

Further reading 
 Manifesto of the Treaty '88 campaign.

Moreton-Robinson, Aileen (2015) The White Possessive: Property, Power, and Indigenous Sovereignty. Minneapolis: University of Minnesota Press. .

External links
 Official website of the Sovereign Union of First Nations and Peoples in Australia, formed at Mt Kaputar in NSW in June 1999, formalised in May 2012 at the Kuradji Tent Embassy, near Wollongong.

Independence movements
Indigenous Australian politics
Separatism in Australia